is an English land law, trusts law and matrimonial law case. It specifically deals with the translation into money of physical contributions from a cohabitee or spouse (as regards each other), under which its principles have been largely superseded.

The case stood for the proposition that a no-owning cohabitee contributing to the cost of running a house and, even, quite common renovations to a derelict property did not, in itself, create a beneficial interest in that person's favour. All of the reasoning of the judgment was delivered Lord Bridge, receiving four concurrences from the other judges who had read his judgment in advance. Its strict limits on equity flowing to a non-owning partner were doubted in Stack v Dowden, in which the final court of appeal sitting in 2007 said "the law has moved on".

In the lower court it dealt with a follow-on aspect of finding — instead — a valid contribution: the question of whether, in a repossession scenario the pre-purchase home improver who is not the borrower nor the legal owner (in this case it was the spouse/partner of the borrower) is in "actual occupation". If so that would override and outrank the lender's interests in the property. That court's panel found (2-1) that Rosset's renovation works during the school day, including on the date of making of the mortgage/secured overdraft, did amount to actual occupation.

Facts
Mr and Mrs Rosset had bought a semi-derelict house called Vincent Farmhouse on Manston Road, in Thanet, Kent, with Mr Rosset’s family trust money. The trustees had insisted on his sole ownership as a condition for taking the trust money. He had funded the cost of the renovations to the house. She had made no financial contributions to the acquisition or renovations, but had done decorating and helped by assisting in the professional building works in the immediate two months before their full-time moving in (including at night). Mrs Rosset was in possession of the home on 7 November 1982, but contracts were not exchanged until 23 November. Mr Rosset took out a loan from Lloyds Bank and secured it with a mortgage on the home. The charge was executed on 14 December, without Mrs Rosset’s knowledge, and completion took place on 17 December. The charge was registered on 7 February 1983. Then Mr Rosset defaulted on the loan. Lloyd's Bank sought possession of the home in the late 1980s as the loan fell into arrears.

Mrs Rosset argued that she had a right to stay because she had not consented to the mortgage, and she had an overriding interest in the property. Under the Land Registration Act 1925 section 70(1)(g) (now Land Registration Act 2002 Schedule 3, paragraph 2) the bank's interest, therefore, ranked behind hers.

The bank contended she had no property rights in the home, amongst other things, because the work she had done was not enough to give her an equitable proprietary right. Secondly, as found in the lower courts, she was not "in actual occupation" at the relevant date.

Judgment

Court of Appeal
The Court of Appeal 2—1 held that Mrs Rosset was in actual occupation of her home. Nicholls LJ held that it had been a common intention, on the facts, that she would share in the property. She had done acts to her detriment, and she was in actual occupation at the relevant date through the builders, agreeing with the court below. The term ‘actual occupation’ does not require physical presence, and daily visits of Mrs Rosset to the semi-derelict house was enough. He also suggested builders for Mrs Rosset were also occupying on her behalf.

Purchas LJ agreed.  He clarified in his view the meaning of actual occupation should reflect equitable rules, and so undiscoverable people’s interests would not bind. Further in his view, Mrs Rosset's occupation was "discoverable".

Mustill LJ dissented, finding Rossett not, in his view in actual occupation.

House of Lords
The court decided Mrs Rosset had no beneficial interest in the property. There were no discussions to that effect, and the work Mrs Rosset did was not enough for a constructive trust.

The court also held, obiter, the date to determine whether Mrs Rosset was in occupation under LRA 1925 section 70 was the date the charge was created, i.e. 17 December just as Scarlett J had interpreted the law at trial; however, it abjectly refused to be drawn into whether Rosset was "in actual occupation" (clarifying this would need to be before completion). In this court's view, finding unlike the courts below, no equitable interest of Rosset, it would be unnecessary to look at her actual occupation as she, in reality, had no strict economic right to be there so as to outrank the lender.

Lord Bridge gave the only legal opinion, holding that because there had never been any express agreement that she would have a share, nor any contributions to the purchase price, Mrs Rosset could establish no right in the home. The other judges said they had pre-read this judgment and they approved it. He said:

Lord Griffiths, Lord Ackner, Lord Oliver and Lord Jauncey concurred.

Significance
Lloyds Bank plc v Rosset was subjected to heavy criticism for failing to recognise that work might generate an equitable interest in a family home. It was said in Stack v Dowden by Lord Walker that:

However, Stack can be distinguished from Rosset as it was a case involving two legal owners and not a single legal owner and a person claiming a beneficial interest. In that regard Lord Walker's criticism was forceful obiter dicta and did not repeal Rosset. Lloyds Bank plc v Rosset, which as House of Lord's authority, must be repealed by a later cases of equal authority (i.e. now in the Supreme Court), must, according the doctrine of stare decisis, still be seen as the leading case on constructive trust claims regarding single legal owner properties.

See also

English trusts law
Stack v Dowden
Common intention (Property law)

Notes

External links
 Judgment on BAILLI

English property case law
House of Lords cases
1990 in case law
1990 in British law
English land case law
Lloyds Banking Group